Burned is the seventh volume of the House of Night fantasy series written by P.C. Cast and Kristin Cast.

Zoey's soul has shattered and while her friends search through Kramisha's prophetic poems to bring her back Stevie Rae has to step in her shoes and hold the House of Night together while dealing with her own secrets.

Plot

Isle of Sgiach
Stark, Darius and Aphrodite follow the clues in Kramisha's prophetic poems and take Zoey's body to the Isle of Sgiach to find a way of getting Zoey back. They gain entrance because of Stark's being the blood relative of Seoras, the queen's Guardian (the "bridge of blood"). Together with Sgiach they decipher the rest of the poem and realize that Stark must become a Shaman to step into the Otherworld.

Stark sacrifices on the altar of Seol ne Gigh and through pain he enters a trance where he kills the evil side of himself to become a Shaman. After the fight, the Black Bull leads him to the Otherworld.

Otherworld
Zoey meets Heath in the Otherworld and refuses to be parted from him a second time. As time passes she becomes more and more erratic. Heath feels bad as he sees her fall apart, but is powerless to stop it as Zoey herself is too afraid to accept the lost parts of her soul back.

When Stark arrives, he follows Aphrodite's advice and contacts Heath first, as Zoey wouldn't leave with Heath still in the Otherworld with her. Stark argues that Zoey might still accept her soul back and stay with Heath, but Neferet would win in the real world. Realizing that Stark speaks the truth and is not motivated by jealousy anymore, Heath speaks one more time with Zoey and disappears.

While Zoey stays behind, crying, Stark comes and tries to get Zoey to come back, but she is too scared. To get her to act, Stark comes out of the enchanted meadow and faces Kalona in an arena. Terrified that Stark might die too, Zoey finally calls back the fragments of her soul. Stark is temporarily distracted, and Kalona kills him. Zoey calls air and fixes him on the wall of the arena. She calls in the debt he owns her for Heath's death to save Stark, and Nyx materializes and forces Kalona to share some of his immortality with Stark before banishing him from her realm.

Tulsa
After having nearly burned down on a roof, Stevie Rae recovers quickly due to Rephaim's Immortal blood and their Imprint. She learns of Zoey's soul shattering and has to balance the expectations of those who would expect her to step in Zoey's shoes. She escapes her friends to talk to Rephaim and the two make a pact to help each other until Zoey or Kalona returns to her or his body.

Stevie Rae follows the clues in Kramisha's poems and decides to invoke Light, materialized as one of the bulls. By wrongly presuming that Light will materialize as the white Bull, she accidentally invokes Darkness, who nonetheless gives Stark access to the Otherworld. To reach her in time, Rephaim calls unto the immortal powers of his father to heal his wing, without realizing that it's actually Darkness too, that answers. He reaches her in time and takes on her debt to Darkness, allowing the Bull to feed on his pain. To save him, Stevie Rae calls the black Bull, Light and accepts to be forever bound to Rephaim's humanity in exchange for Light's saving him. The Bulls start fighting and disappear. Dallas appears and takes a wounded Stevie Rae home.
 
When she heals she takes the red fledglings to conquer the tunnels. On the way,  Dallas discovers an affinity for the New world, electricity, and leads them to the kitchens where the renegades are gathered. Five of them die in the ensuing confrontation, but none of Stevie Rae's, because of her Earth affinity and the others flee. Stevie Rae and Dallas remain behind to finish cleaning up. Dallas kisses Stevie Rae when Rephaim finds them, alerted by the Imprint. Realizing that Stevie Rae has saved and sheltered him, Dallas lets himself be influenced by the residual Darkness left by the renegades and fights him. When Stevie Rae protects Rephaim, Dallas accepts Darkness and Changes and angrily rushes out, threatening to tell everyone at the House of Night the truth. When she finds out he has stolen her car, Stevie Rae lets Rephaim fly her to Gilcrease, where she goes to sleep.
 
The next day, Stevie Rae calls Lenobia, to find that Dallas has never reached the House of Night, and Aphrodite, to learn that she has had a vision about her and Rephaim. Stevie Rae and Rephaim confess their feelings for each other and Nyx offers them a vision of a human Rephaim. As they look transfixed, Kalona returns to the real world, along with Zoey, and Rephaim leaves, confessing he can't turn his back on his father.

Characters

Zoey Redbird
Nyx
Stark
Stevie Rae
Neferet
Heath Luck
Aphrodite
Kalona

Sylvia Redbird – Zoey's grandmother
Erin Bates
Shaunee Cole
Damien Maslin
Erik Night
Jack Twist – Damien's boyfriend
Rephaim – leader of the Raven Mockers
Darius – A son of Erebus
Sgiach – Queen Of Skye
Seoras – Sgiach's Guardian

Reception
In its opening week the book ranked 1st on the New York Times, USA Today Top 150 Bestseller List. It won the Goodreads Choice Award for Favorite Book, Young Adult Fantasy, Favorite Heroine and a nomination for Teen Read Award for Best series in 2010.
"Any fans of this book would be out of their mind not to rush out and buy this new installment. It is a must buy and must read to anyone who has been following the House of the Night series. Now that I have come this far I know there is no turning back."(ParaNormal Romance)

References

External links
 Burned on the official website
 Burned on the publisher's website

2010 American novels
American young adult novels
American fantasy novels
American horror novels
American romance novels
American vampire novels
House of Night series
2010 fantasy novels
Young adult fantasy novels
St. Martin's Press books